Baronscourt, Barons-Court or Baronscourt Castle is a Georgian country house and estate 4.5 km southwest of Newtownstewart in County Tyrone, Northern Ireland, and is the seat of the Duke of Abercorn. It is a Grade A-listed building.

The Baronscourt is the great house in Ireland of the earls and later marquesses and dukes of Abercorn. It was called Baronscourt because in the Irish Peerage the Abercorns are the Barons Hamilton of Strabane. The house is surrounded by the Baronscourt estate. The first house on this site was built by the architect William Chambers in 1742. However it was rebuilt and modified at many occasions. Notably it was rebuilt between 1779 and 1781 by James Hamilton, the 8th Earl of Abercorn.  The house is a neo-classical mansion surrounded by ornate Italian-style gardens, and woodland. The estate also features an 18-hole golf course which celebrated its centenary in 2014.

The traditional burial place of the Dukes of Abercorn and their families is the graveyard at Baronscourt Parish Church.

Baronscourt was originally designed by George Steuart in 1778, and it was built 1779–1782.
The house is seven bays wide and three stories high with a loggia of coupled Tuscan columns and a rotunda at the centre of the plan. The pediment contains the coat of arms of the Duke of Abercorn's family. The house was soon remodelled in 1791 by John Soane. Robert Woodgate was responsible to oversee the works.

James Hamilton's agent described the alterations as:

"He just reverses the house, what was the backside is to be the entrance, and the front part of the rere. The drawing room, parlour and as far back in the hall as the pillars, is to be thrown into one gallery."

Soane also designed a glasshouse in 1789.

Soon after the works were completed, they were destroyed by a 1796 fire which damaged everything except the wings.
Robert Woodgate was brought back to oversee the reconstruction of the house 1797–1798.

In 1835-1843 Richard and William Vitruvius Morrison were brought in to undertake further modifications to the house including the library.
In the early part of the 20th century A.T. Bolton made copies of Soane's original drawings.
In the late 20th century David Hicks remodelled the library.

An agent's house was designed and built by James Martin in 1741–1745.
David Sheehan, stonecutter, made 3-4 chimney pieces for the 8th Earl in 1745. Was this for a house which no longer exists?
James Bloomfield undertook landscape improvements in 1746. 
James Miller built stables in 1749.
James Dick and Alexander Stewart were employed as stonecutters on the new house 1778–1781.
Mr. Hawkshaw was the foreman on the new house.
James Lee worked as a plasterer in 1794.
Peter Frederick Robinson built Rock Cottage in 1832 and Newtownstuart Gate in 1835.
Joseph Bell designed and built new stables in the baronial style for the 2nd Duke in 1889.

Burials in the cemetery of the Baronscourt Parish Church
James Hamilton, 1st Duke of Abercorn
James Hamilton, 2nd Duke of Abercorn
James Hamilton, 3rd Duke of Abercorn
Alexandra Hamilton, Duchess of Abercorn

References

Bibliography 
 
 Murdoch, Tessa (ed.) (2022). Great Irish Households: Inventories from the Long Eighteenth Century. Cambridge: John Adamson, pp. 177–85  
  - Abercorn to Balmerino

External links
 

Georgian architecture in Ireland
Country houses in Northern Ireland
Grade A listed buildings